Ang Dalawang Ikaw (International title: The Other You / is a 2021 Philippine television drama series broadcast by GMA Network. Directed by Jorron Monroy, it stars Ken Chan in the title role. It premiered on June 21, 2021 on the network's Afternoon Prime line up. The series concluded on September 10, 2021 with a total of 60 episodes. It was replaced by Stories from the Heart in its timeslot.

The series is streaming online on YouTube.

Cast and characters

Lead cast
 Ken Chan as Nelson Sarmiento / Tyler Franco / Dominiano Alberto

Supporting cast
 Rita Daniela as Mia Perez-Sarmiento
 Anna Vicente as Beatrice Illustre-Franco
 Jake Vargas as Lucas Javier
 Jhoana Marie Tan as Lani Delgado
 Lianne Valentin as Jo Escobar
 Jeremy Sabido as King Bautista
 Dominic Roco as Greg Perez
 Ricardo Cepeda as Ernesto Sarmiento
 Sharmaine Arnaiz as Belen
 Dindo Arroyo as Chavez
 Marco Alcaraz as Rex
 Ping Medina as Nicco
 Olive Espino as Racal

Guest cast
 Adrian Carido as young Nelson
 Ervic Vijandre as young Ernesto
 Rosemarie Sarita as Leticia "Letty" Sarmiento
 Angela Alarcon as Chloe

Production
Principal photography commenced in February 2021 in Tagaytay and Bataan. In March 2021, filming and the series premiere were postponed due to COVID-19 pandemic.

Episodes

References

External links
 
 

2021 Philippine television series debuts
2021 Philippine television series endings
Filipino-language television shows
GMA Network drama series
Television productions suspended due to the COVID-19 pandemic
Television shows set in the Philippines